Dekalb County Home and Barn is a historic poor house and barn located at Garrett, DeKalb County, Indiana.  The barn was built in 1908, and is a -story, "T"-shaped building.  The first level is constructed of rubble stone, with frame upper stories.

It was added to the National Register of Historic Places in 1983.

References

Barns on the National Register of Historic Places in Indiana
Houses on the National Register of Historic Places in Indiana
Buildings and structures in DeKalb County, Indiana
National Register of Historic Places in DeKalb County, Indiana
Barns in Indiana
Houses in DeKalb County, Indiana